Hasta el Fin (Until the End) is Monchy & Alexandra's third studio released album under the Sony International Label, which was released on October 19, 2004.

Track listing

Charts

Weekly charts

Year-end charts

See also
List of number-one Billboard Tropical Albums from the 2000s

References

Monchy & Alexandra albums
2004 albums
Spanish-language albums